EnterpriseDB (EDB), a privately held company based in Massachusetts, provides software and services based on the open-source database PostgreSQL (also known as Postgres), and is one of the largest contributors to Postgres. EDB develops and integrates performance, security, and manageability enhancements into Postgres to support enterprise-class workloads. EDB has also developed database compatibility for Oracle to facilitate the migration of workloads from Oracle to EDB Postgres and to support the operation of many Oracle workloads on EDB Postgres.

EDB provides a portfolio of databases and tools that extend Postgres for enterprise workloads. This includes fully managed Postgres in the cloud, extreme high availability for Postgres, command line migration tools, Kubernetes Operator and container images, management, monitoring and optimizing of Postgres, enterprise ready Oracle migration tools and browser-based schema migration tools 

EnterpriseDB was purchased by Great Hill Partners in 2019.

In June 2022, Bain Capital Private Equity announced a majority growth investment in the company, whereafter EDB continues to operate under the leadership of Ed Boyajian, President and CEO of EDB, an open source pioneer who has led the company since 2008. 

Great Hill Partners, which acquired EDB in 2019, remains a significant shareholder.

History
EDB was founded in 2004. The growing acceptance of open source software created a market opportunity and the company wanted to challenge the database incumbents with a standards based product that was compatible with other vendor solutions. EnterpriseDB sought to develop an open source-based, enterprise-class relational database to compete with established vendors at an open source price point.

EDB introduced its database, EnterpriseDB 2005, in 2005. It was named Best Database Solution at LinuxWorld that year, beating solutions from Oracle, MySQL, and IBM. EDB renamed the database EnterpriseDB Advanced Server with its March 2006 release. The database was renamed Postgres Plus Advanced Server in March 2008. In April 2016, with the introduction of the EDB Postgres Platform, EDB's fully integrated next-generation data management platform, the database was renamed to EDB Postgres Advanced Server.

In 2020, EDB acquired 2ndQuadrant, a global Postgres solutions and tools company based out of the UK, becoming the leader in the PostgreSQL market.

Customers 
EDB serves more than 1,500 customers, including leading financial services, government, media, and communications and information technology organizations.

Products

BigAnimal  
BigAnimal is EDB's fully managed Postgres in the cloud. This is EDB's database-as-a-Service (DBaaS) offering, available on both Microsoft Azure and Amazon Web Services (AWS).

EDB Postgres Distributed 
EDB Postgres Distributed (previously known as Postgres-BDR) provides high availability for Postgres databases, and up to five 9s of availability and flexible deployment options.

Migration Toolkit  
This is a command-line tool to migrate tables and data from a company's DBMS to Postgres or EDB Postgres Advanced Server.

Cloud Native Postgres 
Cloud Native Postgres adds agility to Postgres from a deployment and an auto-healing perspective, making Postgres the data store for microservices.

Postgres Enterprise Manager 
Postgres Enterprise Manager manages, monitors, and optimizes Postgres and EDB Postgres Advanced Server.

EDB Postgres Advanced Server (EPAS) 
EDB Postgres Advanced Server (EPAS) is EDB’s core database product, and is included in EDB's Enterprise subscription plan. It includes functionality that focuses on Oracle database compatibility, security, productivity, and performance.

Migration Portal 

Migration Portal provides detail on what enterprises need to migrate their Oracle databases to PostgreSQL. It then starts the migration by producing DDLs that are compatible with EDB Postgres Advanced Server.

EDB Postgres Containers 

EDB is a member of the Red Hat OpenShift Primed Program with a set of two certified Linux Container images published in the Red Hat Container Catalog. One container is preconfigured with the EDB Postgres Advanced Server 9.5 database, EDB Postgres Failover Manager, and pgPool for load balancing. The other container is preconfigured with EDB Postgres Backup and Recovery.

Postgres Vision

Postgres Vision is an annual conference started by EnterpriseDB in 2016 with Kathleen Kennedy of the Massachusetts Institute of Technology. The first event was held in October 2016 in San Francisco  and the second event was held in June 2017 in Boston. Postgres Vision is multi-day event that focuses on current and future enterprise usage of Postgres and open source data management. The event draws database administrators, architects, data scientists, line of business executives, C-level executives, and developers to network, share best practices, and explore new and emerging use cases for Postgres.

References

Technology companies based in Massachusetts
Software companies based in Massachusetts
Free database management systems
American companies established in 2004
Free software companies
PostgreSQL
Cross-platform software
Software companies established in 2004
Software companies of the United States